Helophilus hochstetteri, commonly called the metallic blue hoverfly is a native hoverfly of New Zealand.

H. hochstetteri is often seen on flowers collecting pollen and nectar.

References

Diptera of New Zealand
Eristalinae
Insects described in 1875